This is a list of multi-instrumentalists, musicians notable for a professional level of proficiency with two or more musical instruments.



A

Adam Levine
Adam Young
Adrian Rollini
Al Jardine
Alan Stivell
Alan Wilder
Alanis Morissette
Alex James
Alexander Gradsky
Andrew Bird
Andrew VanWyngarden
Andre 3000
Andy Summers
Anna Calvi
Anthony Cedric Vuagniaux
Anthony Newman
Anton Newcombe
AR Rahman
Arjen Anthony Lucassen
Atilla Özdemiroğlu

B

Beck
Ben Folds
Ben Goldwasser
Ben Kenney
Ben Watt
Benny Carter
Benny Gallagher
Bill Evans
Bill Nelson
Billie Joe Armstrong
Billy Corgan
Billy Preston
Billy Sherwood
Björk
Bob Casale
Bob Cooper
Bob Mothersbaugh
Brant Bjork
Brendon Urie
Brent Fitz
Bret Autrey
Brian Eno
Brian Jones
Brian Landrus
Brian May
Brian Tichy
Brian Transeau
Brian Wilson
Bruce Springsteen
Bruno Mars
Bryan Ferry
Bud Shank
Butch Walker

C

Carl Wilson
Carrie Underwood
Carwyn Ellis
Cat Power
Cat Stevens
Catfish the Bottleman
Charles Kelley
Charles Mingus
Charlie Parker
Chet Baker
Chris Carmichael
Chris Cornell
Chris Joss
Chris Martin
Chris Potter
Chris Thile
Christopher Wolstenholme
Cosmo Sheldrake
Cyndi Lauper

D
 
D'Angelo
Damien Rice
Damon Albarn
Dan Swano
Daniel Chorzempa
Daniel Gildenlöw
Daniel Johns
Daron Malakian
Darren Criss
Dave Dobbyn
Dave Grohl
Dave Mason
Dave Van Ronk
David Bedford
David Bowie
David Byrne
David Gilmour
David Lindley
David Munrow
Debbie Harry
Dennis Wilson
Denny Laine
Derek Shulman
Devin Townsend
Dhani Harrison
Dido
Dimash Kudaibergen
Dolly Parton
Don Moye
Doug Sahm
Doug Kershaw
Duff McKagan

E
  
Eddie Van Halen
Eddie Vedder
Edgar Winter
Egon Petri
Elfriede Jelinek
Elliott Smith
Elvis Presley
Emitt Rhodes
Enya
Eric Dolphy
Erkan Oğur
Espen Lind

F

Fatboy Slim
Feist
Fela Anikulapo Kuti
Ferenc Fricsay
Flea
Frank Zappa
Freddie Mercury
French Kiwi Juice

G
 
G.T. Moore
Gareth Sager
Garth Hudson
Gary Clark Jr.
Gary Green
Gary Husband
Gary Numan
Geddy Lee
P-Orridge
George Harrison
George Michael
Gerald Casale
Gethin Davies
Giulio Carmassi
Grace Slick
Graham Bond
Graham Lyle
Gunhild Carling
Gustavo Cerati
Guy Berryman
Gylve Nagell

H

Hans Rosbaud
Hayley Williams
Henry Lau
Herbie Hancock
Hermeto Pascoal

I

Ian Anderson
Ian McDonald
Ian Underwood
Imogen Heap
Ira Sullivan
Iva Davies

J

Jack Black
Jack White
Jacob Collier
Jaki Byard
James Morrison
James Murphy
James Reyne
James Taylor
Jamie Cullum
Jeff Buckley
Jeff Lynne
Jeremy Enigk
Jerry Garcia
Jim Sturgess
Jimmy Page
Joe Becker
Joe Walsh
John Cale
John Deacon
John Entwistle
John Fogerty
John Frusciante
John Lennon
John Lydon
John Mayer
John Paul Jones
John Weathers
John Williamson
John Zorn
Johnny Depp
Jon Brion
Jon Walker
Jonathan Davis
Jonny Buckland
Jonny Greenwood
Joseph Jarman
Josh Homme
Josh Klinghoffer
Josh Ramsay
Julian Gallagher

K

KT Tunstall
Karl Wallinger
Kate Bush
Keith Jarrett
Keith Moon
Keith Richards
Ken Hensley
Kerry Minnear
Kevin Parker
Klayton
Krist Novoselic

L

Laurie Anderson
Lauryn Hill
Lenny Kravitz
Les Claypool
Lester Bowie
Levent Yüksel
Levon Helm
Lindsey Buckingham
Lionel Hampton
Lisa Lopes
Liz Phair
Louis Cole
Lowell George
Lucy Kaplansky
Luis Alberto Spinetta

M

M. Shadows
Madlib
Marko Hietala
Marco Restrepo
Marcus Mumford
Mark Mothersbaugh
Mark Salling
Martin Irigoyen
Matt Hsu's Obscure Orchestra
Matt Sharp
Matthew Bellamy
Maurice Gibb
Maynard Ferguson
Michael Angelakos
Michael Monroe
Michelle Branch
Mick Jagger
Mick Karn
Mike Brown
Mike Dirnt
Mike Love
Mike Mills
Mike Oldfield
Mike Patton
Mike Portnoy
Mike Rutherford
Mike Shinoda
Miles Jaye
Myleene Klass

N

Natasha Khan
Neal Morse
Neil Finn
Neil Young
Nick Cave
Nick Drake
Nick Jonas
Nick Oliveri
Nils Lofgren
Nobunny
Noel Gallagher
Norah Jones
Nuno Bettencourt

O

Ornette Coleman

P

Owen Pallett
P!nk
PJ Harvey
Pat Sansone
Patrice Rushen
Patrick Stump
Paul McCandless
Paul McCartney
Paul Simon
Paul Weller
Pekka Pohjola
Pete Townshend
Pete Trewavas
Peter Gabriel
Peter Green
Peter Steele
Pharrell Williams
Phil Collins
Phil Shulman
Prince

Q

Quan Yeomans

R

Raghav Sachar
Rahsaan Roland Kirk
Ray Charles
Ray Davies
Ray Parker Jr.
Ray Shulman
Regina Spektor
Regine Chassagne
Rhiannon Giddens
Ric Grech
Richard Marx
Richard Reed Parry
Rick Wright
Rick van der Linden
Ringo Starr
Rob Swire
Robert Wyatt
Roger Daltrey
Roger Hodgson
Roger Taylor
Roger Waters
Ron Geesin
Ron Wood
Rory Gallagher
Roscoe Mitchell
Roy Clark
Roy Wood
Ruth Underwood
Ryan Tedder
RZA

S

Sammy Davis Jr.
Sananda Maitreya
Serj Tankian
Shadmehr Aghili
Shakira
Shavo Odadjian
Sidney Bechet
Sie7e
Simon Le Bon
Siouxsie Sioux
Solveig Heilo
Squarepusher
Stéphane Grappelli
Stephen Stills
Steve Hogarth
Steve Lieberman
Steve Winwood
Steve Warren
Steven Tyler
Steven Wilson
Stevie Wonder
Stewart Copeland
Sting
Sufjan Stevens
Sully Erna
Synyster Gates

T

Taylor Hawkins
Taylor Swift 
Taylor York
Terry Edwards
Terry Kath
The Edge
The Rev
Thijs van Leer
Thom Yorke
Thomas Dolby
Thomas Lang
Tim Blake
Tim Finn
Tim Rice-Oxley
Tim Weed
Tinashe Kachingwe
Todd Rundgren
Tom Petty
Tom Scholz
Tomas Forsberg
Tommy Lee
Tony Banks
Toto Cutugno
Tracy Chapman
Trent Reznor
Trevor Rabin
Troy Donockley
Troy Van Leeuwen
Tré Cool
Tuomas Holopainen
Turgun Alimatov
Tyler Joseph

V

Van Morrison
Vangelis
Varg Vikernes
Ville Valo
Visitante

W

Walter "Junie" Morrison
"Weird Al" Yankovic
Will Champion
Win Butler

Y

Yusef Lateef

Z

Zach Hill
Zedd 
Željko Joksimović

References